Acrocephalella is an extinct genus from a well-known class of fossil marine arthropods, the trilobites. It lived from 501 to 497 million years ago during the Guzhangian of the late Cambrian Period.

Distribution 
A. granulosa is present in the Cambrian of the Russian Federation (Nganasany Member, Kulyumbe Formation, Kulyumbe River, Krasnoyar, 68.0°N - 88.8°E).

References

Ptychoparioidea
Ptychopariida genera
Cambrian trilobites
Fossils of Russia
Guzhangian
Paibian
Guzhangian genus first appearances
Paibian genus extinctions